The Young Need Discipline is the second studio album by Mornington Peninsula, Melbourne indie band The Fauves.

Track listing
(all songs by The Fauves)
 "The Driver Is You" 
 "Dwarf On Dwarf" 
 "Cheroot" 
 "White Boy Needs It" 
 "Caesar's Surrender" 
 "Hey It's Only My Virile Suit"  
 "Man Lessons"
 "Glitter Us" 
 "Trevor" 
 "Killer Whale" 
 "Call Me True Believer" 
 "Herding Instinct" 
 "Dead Rubber"

Personnel

 Andrew Cox - Guitar, vocals
 Philip Leonard - Guitar, vocals
 Adam Newey - Drums, vocals
 Jack - Bass, vocals

References

The Fauves albums
1994 albums